The following is a list of massacres that have occurred in Singapore (numbers may be approximate):

References

Singapore

Massacres
Massacres